Robert Tata (January 27, 1930 – June 11, 2021) was an American politician. A Republican and the member of the Virginia House of Delegates from 1984 to 2014, representing the 85th district in Virginia Beach. Tata announced that he would not run for reelection in 2013.

Early life
Tata was born and raised in Detroit, the son of Italian immigrants. He attended the University of Virginia, where he played varsity football and baseball. He was drafted in 1953 by the Detroit Lions of the National Football League, but was cut in training camp. He returned to Charlottesville, Virginia to complete his B.S. degree in education and met his future wife, Martha Jeraldine "Jerry" Morris, while doing his student teaching. Tata served in the United States Army 1954–1956. He and his wife then moved to Norfolk, Virginia, where they both took school jobs. Tata later received an M.S. degree in guidance and counseling from the University of Virginia.

Coaching career

Tata spent about 30 years as a teacher and guidance counselor in the Hampton Roads area; he spent a number of those years serving as a football coach at the schools where he worked. At his first stop, Norfolk Catholic High School, his teams were 8–81 in the 1956 and 1957 seasons. Tata was the 19th head football coach at The Apprentice School in Newport News, Virginia and he held that position for the 1963 season.  His coaching record at Apprentice was 3–3–2.

In 1965, his only year as head coach at Granby High School, the team went 10−1, losing only the state championship game.  He then coached at Norview High School 1967 to 1979, winning six district championships with an overall record of 101−32−2.

Personal life and death
Tata taught for 40 years, and served for four years on the Virginia Beach School Board. The Tatas had two sons and a daughter. Robert M. Tata attended the United States Naval Academy; he became a captain in the United States Naval Reserve, and a lawyer. Anthony J. Tata, a West Point graduate, rose to the rank of brigadier general in the United States Army and is a novelist. Kendall Tata went to the University of Virginia and James Madison University, and became a Virginia Beach high school teacher and track coach. Tata died on June 11, 2021, in Stanardsville, Virginia.

References

External links
 
 

1930 births
2021 deaths
21st-century American politicians
The Apprentice Builders football coaches
High school football coaches in Virginia
Republican Party members of the Virginia House of Delegates
University of Virginia alumni
Politicians from Detroit
Politicians from Virginia Beach, Virginia
Baseball players from Detroit
Players of American football from Detroit
Sportspeople from Virginia Beach, Virginia
School board members in Virginia
American people of Italian descent
20th-century American politicians